The Kent Battle of Britain Museum is an aviation museum located in Hawkinge, Kent, focused on the Battle of Britain. The Spirit of the Few Monument is in the grounds of the museum.

Collection 
Exhibits:
 De Havilland Moth replica G-AAAH
 Fieseler Fi 103
 DFS Grunau Baby D-3-340
 Supermarine Spitfire replica
 Boulton Paul Defiant replica L7005
 Hawker Hurricane replica N2532
 North American Harvard T2.B N7033
 Bristol Blenheim
 Fokker Dr.I replica
 Gotha G.IV replica
 Heinkel He 111

External links 

 Kent Battle of Britain Museum

References 

Britain Museum
Military aviation museums in England
Museums in Folkestone and Hythe District
Britain Museum